John Henry Sneyd Hunt (24 November 1874 – 16 September 1916) was an English first-class cricketer active 1902–12 who played for Middlesex. He was born in Kensington; died in Ginchy, Somme.

References

1874 births
1916 deaths
English cricketers
Middlesex cricketers
Gentlemen cricketers
British military personnel killed in World War I